Monroe is a surname of Scottish origin, also spelled Munro. Notable people with the surname include:
 Alan H. Monroe (1903–1975), professor, creator of Monroe's motivated sequence
 Alexander W. Monroe (1817–1905), American politician and Confederate States Army officer
 Bill Monroe (1911–1996), American musician
 Burt Monroe (1930–1994), American ornithologist
 Christopher Monroe (born 1965), American physicist
 Craig Monroe (born 1977), American MLB baseball player
 Darryl Monroe (born 1986), American basketball player in the Israeli Basketball Premier League
 Earl Monroe (born 1944), American Hall of Fame basketball player
 Greg Monroe (born 1990) American professional basketball player* 
 Jack Monroe (disambiguation) Disambiguation
 James Monroe (1758–1831), the 5th U.S. president, in office from 1817 to 1825
 James Monroe (1799–1870), member of the U.S. House of Representatives and nephew of President Monroe
 James T. Monroe, professor of Arabic and comparative literature
 Jordan Monroe (born 1986), American glamour model
 Kristen Monroe (born 1946), American professor of political science
 Larry Monroe (baseball) (born 1956), American MLB pitcher
 Larry Monroe (radio personality) (1942–1914), American radio host in Austin, Texas
 Lucy Monroe (1906–1987), American singer
 Maika Monroe (born 1993), American actress and professional kiteboarder
 Marilyn Monroe (1926–1962), American actress, singer and model
 Mircea Monroe (born 1982), American actress
 Nicholas Monroe (born 1982), American tennis player
 Robert Monroe (1915–1995), author, founder of the Monroe Institute
 Rodney Monroe (born 1968) American basketball player
 Rodrick Monroe (born 1976), American football player
 Tom Monroe (1919-1993), American actor
 Vaughn Monroe (1911–1973), American baritone singer, trumpeter and big band leader

Fictional characters
 Aaron Monroe (Charlie Wernham) from the BBC soap opera EastEnders
 Alison "Sonny" Monroe (Demi Lovato) from the Disney comedy series Sonny with a Chance (2009–2011)
 Andrew Monroe (Colin Tarrant), police officer in British television series The Bill
 Adam Monroe (David Anders) from the NBC drama series Heroes (2006–2010)
 Dana Monroe (Barbara Smith) from the BBC soap opera EastEnders
 Dr Gabriel Monroe (James Nesbitt) title character in the ITV drama series Monroe (2011–2012)
 Grace Monroe, the main protagonist in Book Three (and a minor antagonist in Book Two) of the animated anthology series Infinity Train (2020)
 Harvey Monroe (Ross Boatman), from the BBC soap opera EastEnders
 Dr Marvin Monroe (voiced by Harry Shearer) of the Fox cartoon The Simpsons (1989–present)
 Mina Monroe (voiced by Kari Wahlgren) of the Warner Bros. cartoon Bunnicula (2016–2018)
 Sebastian Monroe, President of the Monroe Republic in Revolution
 Mr. Monroe (Jim J. Bullock) of the Nickelodeon comedy Ned's Declassified School Survival Guide (2004–2007)

See also
 Munro (surname)
 Clan Munro

References

Surnames of Scottish origin
English-language surnames